Park Jong-hoon (born 6 May 1965) is a South Korean former gymnast who competed in the 1988 Summer Olympics.

Education
 Korea National Sport University
 Suwon High School for Agricultural Science

References

External links
 박종훈 (Park Jong Hoon) at Catholic Kwandong University 
 
 

1965 births
Living people
South Korean male artistic gymnasts
Olympic gymnasts of South Korea
Gymnasts at the 1988 Summer Olympics
Olympic bronze medalists for South Korea
Olympic medalists in gymnastics
Asian Games medalists in gymnastics
Gymnasts at the 1986 Asian Games
South Korean academics
Korea National Sport University alumni
Medalists at the 1988 Summer Olympics
Asian Games silver medalists for South Korea
Asian Games bronze medalists for South Korea
Medalists at the 1986 Asian Games
20th-century South Korean people